De Stefano is an Italian surname. People with the surname include:

Francesco De Stefano (born 1999), Italian footballer
Frank De Stefano (born 1948), Australian politician
Gildo De Stefano, Italian journalist
Giorgio De Stefano (died 1977), Italian gangster
Giorgio De Stefano (born 1948), Italian gangster
Giulio De Stefano (born 1929), Italian sailor
Giuseppe De Stefano (born 1969), Italian gangster
Paolo De Stefano (died 1985), Italian gangster of the De Stefano 'ndrina
Paolo Rosario De Stefano (born 1976), Italian gangster
Silvana De Stefano, Italian sculptor
Victoria de Stefano (1940-2023), Italian-Venezuelan novelist, essayist, philosopher and educator
Vitale De Stefano (1889-1959), Italian film actor and director

Italian-language surnames
Patronymic surnames
Surnames from given names